San Colombano is the Italian form of Saint Columbanus.
 
It may also refer to

Ecclesiastical institutes 
 Territorial Abbey of San Colombano, a territorial abbacy at Bobbio, in the province of Piacenza (Emilia-Romagna)
 San Colombano, Fanano, parish church
 Eremo di San Colombano, hermitage in Trentino
 Oratory of San Colombano, church in Bologna

Italian places 

 San Colombano al Lambro, a comune (municipality) in the Italian Province of Milan (Lombardy)
 San Colombano Belmonte, a comune in the Italian Province of Turin (Piedmont)
 San Colombano Certenoli, a comune in the Italian Province of Genoa (Liguria)
 A frazione of Scandicci in the Italian Province of Florence (Tuscany)

Wine grapes 
 San Colombano, another name for the Italian wine grape Verdea
 San Colombano Piccolo, another name for the Italian wine grape Besgano bianco